Bruno Jean Marie Cremer (6 October 1929 – 7 August 2010) was a French actor best known for portraying Jules Maigret on French television, from 1991 to 2005.

Origins 
Bruno Cremer was born in Saint-Mandé, Val-de-Marne, in the eastern suburbs of Paris, France. His mother, Jeanne Rullaert, a musician, was of Belgian Flemish origin and his father, Georges, was a businessman from Lille who, though born French, had taken out Belgian nationality after the French armed forces refused to accept him for service in the First World War. Bruno himself opted for French nationality when he reached the age of 18. His childhood was largely spent in Paris.

Bruno attended the Cours Hattemer, a private school. Having completed his secondary studies, he followed an interest in acting which had interested him since the age of 12 and trained in acting from 1952 at France's highly selective Conservatoire national supérieur d'art dramatique  (English:  French National Academy of Dramatic Arts).

Career 
His career began with ten years spent acting in live theatre, playing roles drawn from works of Shakespeare, Oscar Wilde and Jean Anouilh. Aged already 30, he created the role of Thomas Becket in the 1959 world premiere of Anouilh's Becket, and held Anouilh in veneration all his life. Later Cremer played Max in a French production of Bent by Martin Sherman in 1981. He regarded his basic profession as that of a stage actor, though he gravitated firmly to films.

It was in 1957 that Cremer had his first credited part in a film,  Quand la femme s'en mêle (When a woman meddles), which starred Alain Delon.  However, it was in 1965 that Cremer's career really began to prosper, with the film La 317e section, (The 317th Platoon), directed by Pierre Schoendoerffer and set in Indochina during the French colonial wars. From then onwards, Cremer became a popular actor and appeared in over 110 productions for cinema and television.

While Cremer tried to avoid labels and typecasting, he tended to be offered tough-guy roles, often military men.  Examples from various points in his career include  Section spéciale (1975), La légion saute sur Kolwezi (1980)  and  Là-haut, un roi au-dessus des nuages (2004).

Special Section (French original title: Section spéciale), released in 1975, is about a kangaroo court set up in collaborationist Vichy France to ensure judicial convictions of innocent people so as to mollify the Nazis. A   French language film directed by the Greek-French film director Costa-Gavras, it features Cremer as Lucien Sampaix, a Communist-leaning journalist.

The 1980 film La légion saute sur Kolwezi  (English Operation Leopard), directed by Raoul Coutard, is a documentary-style portrayal of a real-life operation headed by the French Foreign Legion  in the Democratic Republic of the Congo in 1978 to rescue foreign hostages. Cremer plays a military commander.
Pierre Schoendoerffer’s 2004 film Là-haut, un roi au-dessus des nuages (Above the Clouds), based on his own novel, Là-haut. Cremer played the Colonel.

Some 30 other film parts of Cremer included releases by both French and foreign directors. In 1967, for example, came the film The Stranger (Italian: Lo straniero), directed by Italian director Luchino Visconti, based on the novel L'Étranger by Albert Camus, and starring Marcello Mastroianni.
The 1976 release The Good and the Bad (French Le Bon et les Méchants) was directed by Claude Lelouch, with Cremer playing Inspector Bruno Deschamps.

The next year, 1977, came the thriller Sorcerer (French Le Convoi de la peur), based on Georges Arnaud’s novel Le Salaire de la peur and directed by a William Friedkin fresh from the successes of The French Connection (1971) and The Exorcist (1973). In Sorcerer, Cremer played the fraudulent Paris banker Victor Manzon, starring alongside Roy Scheider. In 1989 Cremer starred in Jean-Claude Brisseau’s film drama White Wedding (French Noce Blanche) with Vanessa Paradis.

From 1991, he became a universally known figure in France and elsewhere for his televised portrayal of George Simenon's Commissaire Maigret, a role he played until 2005, totalling 54 episodes. During this period his cinema film commitments were few, though he did appear in 2000 with Charlotte Rampling in Under the Sand, written and directed by François Ozon, in 2001 in José Giovanni's Mon père, il m'a sauvé la vie, and in 2004 in Pierre Schoendoerffer’s  Là-haut, un roi au-dessus des nuages (Above the Clouds). 

In 2005, in the final episode of the Maigret series, his voice was dubbed by that of Vincent Grass in Maigret et l'Étoile du Nord: Cremer was suffering from the throat cancer that made him decide to end his career.

Later years 

Cremer was made an officer of the Légion d’honneur in 2008.

An inveterate smoker of Punch brand cigars, he died of a cancer of the tongue and the pharynx from which he had suffered for several years,  in a Paris hospital on Saturday, 8 August 2010, aged 80. His funeral service was held in Paris on 13 August 2010 at the church of Saint Thomas of Aquinas, in the VIIth arrondissement. He is buried in the Montparnasse cemetery, Paris.

His part autobiography appeared in 2000 under the title, Un certain jeune homme (A certain young man). In it he covered not the whole of his life, but only his early career, until the death of his father.

Married twice, Cremer had a son, Stéphane, by his first wife, and by his second wife, Chantal, whom he married in 1984, two daughters, Constance and Marie-Clementine.

Selected filmography 

 The Long Teeth (1953) - L'homme qui sort de la boîte (uncredited)
 Send a Woman When the Devil Fails (1957) - Bernard
 Mourir d'amour (1961) - L'inspecteur Terens
 Le tout pour le tout (1962) - Le médecin
 The 317th Platoon (1965) - L'adjudant Willsdorf
 Marco the Magnificent (1965) - Guillaume de Tripoli, a Knight Templar
 Objectif 500 millions (1966) - Capitaine Jean Reichau
 Is Paris Burning? (1966, directed by René Clément) - Colonel Rol-Tanguy
 If I Were a Spy (1967) - Matras
 Shock Troops (1967) - Cazal
 The Stranger (1967) - Priest
 Le Viol (1967) - Walter
 The Killer Likes Candy (1968) - Oscar Snell
 La Bande à Bonnot (1968) - Jules Bonnot
 Bye bye, Barbara (1969) - Hugo Michelli
 Les Gauloises bleues (1969) - Le père
 Safety Catch (1970) - Duca Lamberti / Lucas Lamberti
 Pour un sourire (1970) - Michaël
 The Time to Die (1970) - Max Topfer
 Biribi (1971) - Le capitaine
 Lover of the Great Bear (1971) - Saska
 Plot (1972) - Maître Michel Vigneau - l'avocat de Sadiel
  (1973) - L'ex-sergent Donetti
 Le Protecteur (1974) - Beaudrier
 The Suspects (1974) - Commissaire Bonetti
 La Chair de l'orchidée (1975) - Louis Delage
 Section spéciale (1975) - Lucien Sampaix, le journaliste ancien secrétaire général de L'Humanité
 The Good and the Bad (1976) - Bruno
 L'Alpagueur (1976) - L'Epervier
 Sorcerer (1977, directed by William Friedkin) - Victor Manzon - 'Serrano'
 Le Crabe-Tambour (1977) - L'adjudant Willsdorf (uncredited)
 L'Ordre et la sécurité du monde (1978) - Lucas Richter
 A Simple Story (1978) - Georges
 On efface tout (1979) - Claude Raisman
 La Légion saute sur Kolwezi (1980) - Pierre Delbart
 Même les mômes ont du vague à l'âme (1980) - Morton
 Anthracite (1980) - Le préfet des études
 Une robe noire pour un tueur (1980) - Alain Rivière
 La Puce et le Privé (1981) - Valentin 'Val' Brosse
 Aimée (1981) - Carl Freyer
 Espion, lève-toi (1982) - Richard
 Josepha (1982) - Régis Duchemin
 Le prix du danger (1983) - Antoine Chirex
 Effraction (1983) - Pierre
 Un jeu brutal (1983) - Christian Tessier
 Fanny Pelopaja (1984) - Andrés Gallego
 Le Matelot 512 (1984) - Le Commandant Roger
 Le regard dans le miroir (1985) - Éric Chevallier
 Le Transfuge (1985) - Bernard Corain
 Derborence (1985) - Séraphin
 Tenue de soirée (1986) - The Art Lover
 De bruit et de fureur (1988) - Marcel
 Adieu, je t'aime (1988) - Michel Dupré
 Cartel de Radjani (1989) - Joulin
 Noce Blanche (1989, with Vanessa Paradis) - François Hainaut
 La piovra (1989-1992, TV series) - Antonio Espinosa
 Tumultes (1990) - The Father
 Atto di dolore (1990) - Armando
 Money (1991) - Marc Lavater
 Un vampire au paradis (1992) - Antoine Belfond
 Falsch (1992) - Joe
 Taxi de nuit (1993) - Silver, le taxi
 Sous le sable (2000) - Jean Drillon
 Mon père, il m'a sauvé la vie (2001) - Joe
  (2003) - Le colonel

References

External links 

The Bruno Cremer - Maigret website (unofficial) 

1929 births
2010 deaths
People from Saint-Mandé
French people of Belgian descent
Deaths from cancer in France
French male film actors
French male television actors
French male stage actors
French National Academy of Dramatic Arts alumni
20th-century French male actors
21st-century French male actors
Deaths from oral cancer